Stranglers is a true crime podcast hosted by Portland Helmich and provided by Northern Light Productions. It covers the crimes of the murderer known as the Boston Strangler.

Reception 
The podcast was included on The Atlantics list of "The 50 Best Podcasts of 2016".

References

External links 

 

Crime podcasts